Graham Street is light rail station and former railway station on the former Port Melbourne railway line, in the inner Melbourne suburb of Port Melbourne, Victoria, Australia. Located to the north of Graham Street, between Evans Street and Station Street, the station has been demolished since 1987, and is now served by route 109 trams, stopping at a pair of low level platforms.

History
Graham station opened in 1888 as Graham Street, with the name simplified to Graham in 1909. The line through the station opened in 1854. The station was originally a pair of side platforms on a double track railway, and was set in the middle of a landscaped reserve 30.5 m (100 ft) wide, that ran between Boundary and Graham Streets, a remnant of a short lived Parliamentary provision that railway reservations be 100 yards in width.

In 1914, with the opening of the New Pier (later Princes Pier), located to the north of the existing Station Pier (formerly named Railway Pier), Graham became a junction, with a new line diverging from the Up end of the station. The station had two sets of interlocked gates at the Graham Street level crossing, controlled by a signal box on the western side, as well as a number of goods sidings at the Up end. The Bridge Street level crossing also had its own signal box.

By the 1960s, traffic to the port had dropped due to changes in cargo handling, and so in 1961, the branch to Princes Pier was reduced to a single track and worked as a siding, rather than a main line. Further rationalisations were made in December 1969, when the line from Graham to Port Melbourne was singled, with the Up track lifted, and the Up platform taken out of service. The signal box was also closed, replaced by a signal panel in a new station building, located on the Down platform.

The Bridge Street level crossing was provided with boom barriers in 1961, with the signal box abolished soon after.  The Graham Street level crossing, at the Down end of the station, was abolished by October 1970, when grade separation was carried out. Only two lanes of the four lane road were completed, with the other two completed the next year.

The last passenger train ran through the station on 10 October 1987, after it was announced that the line would be converted to light rail. Goods trains had continued to run through the station to Port Melbourne until at least September of that year. The replacement light rail line was officially opened on 18 December 1987.

Tram services
Yarra Trams operates one route via Graham Street station:
 : Box Hill – Port Melbourne

References

External links
 Melway map at street-directory.com.au

Disused railway stations in Melbourne
Railway stations in Australia opened in 1888
Railway stations closed in 1987
1987 disestablishments in Australia
Buildings and structures in the City of Port Phillip
Tram stops in Melbourne
Transport in the City of Port Phillip